Andyrobertsite is a rare, complex arsenate mineral with a blue color. It is found in the Tsumeb mine in Namibia and named after Andrew C. Roberts (b. 1950), mineralogist with the Geological Survey of Canada. A Ca-rich analogue (with Ca instead of Cd) is called calcioandyrobertsite and has a more greenish tint.

References

Arsenate minerals
Monoclinic minerals
Minerals in space group 11